Arcadia Shipmanagement Co. Ltd. is an oil tanker shipping company in Athens, Greece. It specializes in the shipping of oil, and other petroleum products.

Management
Arcadia Shipmanagement Co. Ltd. is run by its founder, Constantine Angelopoulos, and his sons, Panagiotis Angelopoulos and Giorgos Angelopoulos.

History
Arcadia Shipmanagement Co. Ltd. was established in 1998, by Constantine Angelopoulos. The company was named the Greek oil tanker company of the year in 2007. It completed an expansion to its fleet of oil tankers in 2012. In 2012, the company was also certified for good energy consumption. In 2015, the company added two Suezmax tankers to its fleet.

Fleet
Arcadia Shipmanagement Co. Ltd. has a fleet of 13 oil tankers.

References

External links 
Official company website

Shipping companies of Greece
Transport companies established in 1998
Companies based in Athens